The canton of Coucy-le-Château-Auffrique is a former administrative division in northern France. It was disbanded following the French canton reorganisation which came into effect in March 2015. It had 11,720 inhabitants (2012).

The canton comprised the following communes:

Audignicourt
Barisis
Besmé
Bichancourt
Blérancourt
Bourguignon-sous-Coucy
Camelin
Champs
Coucy-le-Château-Auffrique
Coucy-la-Ville
Crécy-au-Mont
Folembray
Fresnes
Guny
Jumencourt
Landricourt
Leuilly-sous-Coucy
Manicamp
Pierremande
Pont-Saint-Mard
Quierzy
Quincy-Basse
Saint-Aubin
Saint-Paul-aux-Bois
Selens
Septvaux
Trosly-Loire
Vassens
Verneuil-sous-Coucy

Demographics

See also
Cantons of the Aisne department

References

Former cantons of Aisne
2015 disestablishments in France
States and territories disestablished in 2015